Meraas() is a Pakistani drama serial that started airing on ARY Digital from 7 December 2017. It is written by Hina Aman, directed by Ali Hassan, and stars Savera Nadeem, Mohsin Abbas Haider, Saboor Aly and Fahad Shaikh in pivotal roles.

Cast
Savera Nadeem as Jahan Aara; a single woman who has a dominant personality and rules over her family because she owns all the property.
Mohsin Abbas Haider as Haris; a poor guy who aims to get settled in abroad. He wants to be rich, for that he can go to any extent.
Saboor Aly as Jiya; an innocent girls who awaits a miracle that'll change her life.
Fahad Shaikh as Ali; Jahan Aara's stepbrother who creates a mess in Jiya's life on wish of his sister.
Shaheen Khan as Ruqaiyya; Jahan Aara's step mother, Ali's mother.
Qavi Khan as Jahan Aara's father, he doesn't want her daughter to get married so that the heritage remains in the family.
Noor-ul-Hassan as Jahan Aara's accomplice.
Asma Abbas as Haris's mother
Kauser Siddiqui as Naseem; she suggest Jiya to Haris's mother for the marriage.
Adnan Gabol as Danny; Haris's friend

Guest Appearance
Ismat Zaidi
Amir Qureshi as Khalid

References

ARY Digital original programming
2017 Pakistani television series debuts
2018 Pakistani television series endings